The Clausius–Mossotti relation expresses the dielectric constant (relative permittivity, εr) of a material in terms of the atomic polarizability, α, of the material's constituent atoms and/or molecules, or a homogeneous mixture thereof. It is named after Ottaviano-Fabrizio Mossotti and Rudolf Clausius. It is equivalent to the  Lorentz–Lorenz equation. It may be expressed as:

where
 is the dielectric constant of the material, which for non-magnetic materials is equal to   where  is the refractive index
 is the permittivity of free space
 is the number density of the molecules (number per cubic meter), and
 is the molecular polarizability in SI-units (C·m2/V).

In the case that the material consists of a mixture of two or more species, the right hand side of the above equation would consist of the sum of the molecular polarizability contribution from each species, indexed by i in the following form:

In the CGS system of units the Clausius–Mossotti relation is typically rewritten to show the molecular polarizability volume  which has units of volume (m3). Confusion may arise from the practice of using the shorter name "molecular polarizability" for both  and  within literature intended for the respective unit system.

The Clausius-Mossotti relation assumes only an induced dipole relevant to its polarizability and is thus inapplicable for substances with a significant permanent dipole. It is applicable to gases such as N2, CO2, CH4 and H2 at sufficiently low densities and pressures. For example, the Clausius-Mossotti relation is accurate for N2 gas up to 1000 atm between 25°C and 125°C. Moreover, the Clausius-Mossotti relation may be applicable to substances if the applied electric field is at a sufficiently high frequencies such that any permanent dipole modes are inactive.

Lorentz–Lorenz equation
The Lorentz–Lorenz equation is similar to the Clausius–Mossotti relation, except that it relates the refractive index (rather than the dielectric constant) of a substance to its polarizability. The Lorentz–Lorenz equation is named after the Danish mathematician and scientist Ludvig Lorenz, who published it in 1869, and the Dutch physicist Hendrik Lorentz, who discovered it independently in 1878.

The most general form of the Lorentz–Lorenz equation is (in CGS units)

This equation is approximately valid for homogeneous solids as well as liquids and gases.

or simply

This applies to gases at ordinary pressures. The refractive index  of the gas can then be expressed in terms of the molar refractivity   as:

,M_h/

References

Bibliography

 
 Lorenz, Ludvig, "Experimentale og theoretiske Undersogelser over Legemernes Brydningsforhold", Vidensk Slsk. Sckrifter 8,205 (1870) https://www.biodiversitylibrary.org/item/48423#page/5/mode/1up
 
 
 O. F. Mossotti, Discussione analitica sull’influenza che l’azione di un mezzo dielettrico ha sulla distribuzione dell’elettricità alla superficie di più corpi elettrici disseminati in esso, Memorie di Mathematica e di Fisica della Società Italiana della Scienza Residente in Modena, vol. 24, p. 49-74 (1850).

Electrodynamics
Electromagnetism
Equations of physics
Electric and magnetic fields in matter